John Turnbull (born 1917) was an Australian-born rower who competed for England.

Boxing career
Turnbull represented England and won a gold medal in the eights at the 1938 British Empire Games in Sydney, New South Wales, Australia.

Personal life
Turnbull attended Geelong Grammar School and was a student at Clare College Cambridge during 1938.

References

1917 births
Possibly living people
English male rowers
Boxers at the 1938 British Empire Games
Commonwealth Games medallists in rowing
Commonwealth Games gold medallists for England
Australian emigrants to the United Kingdom
Medallists at the 1938 British Empire Games